Extended play (EP) is an audio recording longer than a single, but shorter than an album.

Extended Play may also refer to:

X-Play, a television show on G4, formerly known as Extended Play
Extended Play (film), a 1982 short film
An SLP videocassette recording mode; see VHS tape lengths
The EP mode on DVD video recorders; see DVD recorder

Music
Extended Play (Austin Mahone EP), 2013
Extended Play (Cabaret Voltaire EP), 1978
Extended Play (Denver Harbor EP), 2003
Extended Play (Dive EP), 1994
Extended Play (E.g Oblique Graph EP), 1982
Extended Play (Fleetwood Mac EP), 2013
Extended Play (Gin Wigmore EP), 2008
Extended Play (Ladytron EP), 2006
Extended Play (Mi-Sex EP), 2016
Extended Play (Pretenders EP), 1981
Extended Play, a 1994 EP by The Raincoats
Extended Play (Statik Selektah album), 2013
Extended Play, a 2016 EP by LANCO 
Extended Play and Extended Play Two, a pair of EPs released in 2000 by Broadcast
The Extended Play E.P., a 2011 album by T.J. Miller

See also
EP, for EPs named simply "EP"